Edgardo Rito (born 17 February 1996) is a Venezuelan footballer who plays for Oakland Roots. He formerly played for New York Red Bulls II among other clubs.

Career
Rito, who plays as a right back and right midfielder, began his professional career with Atlético El Vigía in 2013. During the 2013/14 season he was a regular starter for the club appearing in 26 league matches. The following season he had a brief stint with ACD Lara. After his brief stint with Lara, Rito joined Estudiantes de Caracas, playing the Copa Venezuela.

On 13 January 2016 it was announced that Rito had signed with Second Division side Yaracuyanos F.C. 
He was then loaned to Mineros de Guayana by  Yaracuyanos F.C. during the 2016 season. During his stint with Mineros, Rito helped the club qualify to the round of 16 of the Copa Venezuela. He scored his first goal for the club on 15 September 2016 in a 3-1 victory over his former club ACD Lara.

The following season he was again sent on loan, this time to Colombian side Patriotas Boyacá. He was a regular starter for Patriotas during the 2017 season as he appeared in 26 matches in all competitions, including 21 league matches. He made his debut in the Copa Sudamericana on 5 April 2017, appearing as a starter in a 1-0 loss to Chilean side Everton. For the 2018 season Rito returned to Venezuela joining Metropolitanos FC. He appeared in 17 matches for the club.

On 20 February 2019 Rito joined New York Red Bulls II on loan from Yaracuyanos F.C. He made his debut with the club on 24 March 2019, appearing as a starter in a 1-1 draw with Nashville SC.

International
Rito was called up Venezuela national under-17 football team in 2012. During August 2014 Rito was called to participate in a training camp with the Venezuela national under-20 football team.

Career statistics

Honours
Individual
USL Championship All League First Team: 2022

References

External links
 
 
 

1996 births
Living people
Venezuelan footballers
Venezuelan expatriate footballers
Association football defenders
Categoría Primera A players
New York Red Bulls II players
USL Championship players
Venezuelan expatriate sportspeople in the United States
Expatriate soccer players in the United States
Atlético El Vigía players
Asociación Civil Deportivo Lara players
Estudiantes de Caracas players
Yaracuyanos FC players
A.C.C.D. Mineros de Guayana players
Patriotas Boyacá footballers
Metropolitanos FC players
Oakland Roots SC players
Venezuelan expatriate sportspeople in Colombia
Expatriate footballers in Colombia
People from Mérida (state)